is the official debut and first major-label single by Hello! Project idol group S/mileage, and their fifth single overall. The single was released on the Zetima Records label on 26 May 2010, distributed by Pony Canyon, after the group completed the "Smile Campaign" which allowed them to make their major debut. It was released in three editions: a normal edition, and two limited edition versions both containing DVDs. All editions sport different jackets. The limited edition versions, as well as the first press of the normal edition, contained a serial number card, which buyers could use to enter a lottery for tickets to the single's release event. Limited quantities of trading cards were also released with the single, and each type was only available at a certain music shop. An A3 poster featuring the cover of the Limited Edition A version was also available for purchase at some shops. The Single V was released on 2 June.

The song's name is written as "", which would usually be read "Yume Miru Jūgo-sai"; however, in this case the title is read "Yume Miru Fifteen".

Track listing

Promotion
To promote the single, multiple events were held. Their first live event after their major debut was held at Tokyo Dome LaQua on 30 May, attracting a crowd of roughly 2,000 people. Prior to the event, S/mileage held a Ustream web broadcast.

A handshake "meet-and-greet" event was held at the Æon Chikusa Shopping Centre in Aichi on 5 June. Two special live events were held on 6 and 26 June, at Yokohama Blitz in Kanagawa and Zepp Osaka in Osaka, open to winners of tickets in the draw. A highly limited supply of DVDs containing footage of the 6 June event was made available on 27 September 2010.

Chart performance
The single peaked at #5 on the weekly Oricon singles charts, charting for four weeks. First-week sales were reported at 20,438 copies. The single peaked at #27 on the Billboard Japan Hot 100 for the week of 7 June, charting for two weeks.

Awards
"Yume Miru 15" won an award for Best Song at the 52nd Japan Record Awards, at which S/mileage were also awarded Newcomer of the Year.

Charts

Personnel
Chino - chorus (1, 2)
Kanon Fukuda - vocal
Shoichiro Hirata - programming (1), arrangement (1)
Yuuka Maeda - vocal
Saki Ogawa - vocal
Yuichi Takahashi - programming (2), arrangement (2), guitar (2)
Tsunku - producer, lyrics (1), composer (1, 2)
Ayaka Wada - vocal

Awards

Japan Record Awards 

The Japan Record Awards is a major music awards show held annually in Japan by the Japan Composer's Association.

|-
|rowspan=2 align="center"| 2010
|rowspan=2 align="center"| S/mileage "Yume Miru 15"
| New Artist
| 
|-
| Best New Artist
|

References

External links
Music video on S/mileage's official YouTube channel
Liner notes on Tsunku's official site
S/mileage discography (single)
S/mileage discography (Single V)
Up-Front Works discography (single)

2010 singles
Japanese-language songs
Angerme songs
Songs written by Tsunku
Song recordings produced by Tsunku
2010 songs